Lutfulla Turaev (born 30 March 1988) in Uzbekistan is a professional footballer who plays as a midfielder for FC Bunyodkor and the Uzbekistan national team.

Club career

Nasaf Qarshi
In 2010, he signed a two-year contract with Uzbek League club Nasaf Qarshi. In 2010 season he played 21 games, scoring 2 goal.

Bunyodkor
In December 2011 he moved to Bunyodkor on free transfer.

International career
In 2010, he made his debut for the Uzbekistan national football team.

Honours

Club

Mash'al Mubarek
 Uzbek League runner-up (1): 2005
 Uzbek Cup runner-up (1): 2006

Nasaf
 Uzbek League runner-up (1): 2011
 Uzbek Cup runner-up (1): 2011
 AFC Cup (1): 2011

Bunyodkor
 Uzbek League (1): 2013
 Uzbek Cup (1): 2013
 Uzbek Cup runner-up (1): 2012

Lokomotiv
 Uzbek League runner-up (1): 2014
 Uzbek Cup (1): 2014
 Uzbekistan Super Cup (1): 2014

Career statistics

References 

 Felda United Sign Two New Import Players From Uzbekistan And Brazil‚ bernama.com, 5 January 2016

1988 births
Living people
Uzbekistani footballers
Uzbekistan international footballers
Uzbekistani expatriate footballers
2015 AFC Asian Cup players
FK Mash'al Mubarek players
FC Nasaf players
FC Bunyodkor players
PFC Lokomotiv Tashkent players
Felda United F.C. players
Terengganu FC players
FC AGMK players
Uzbekistan Super League players
People from Qashqadaryo Region
Association football midfielders
Uzbekistani expatriate sportspeople in Malaysia
AFC Cup winning players